Akira Takeuchi is a Japanese fashion designer. Along with Tayuka Nakanishi, he is the founder and main designer of the Theatre Products fashion brand, which is popular in the Harajuku and Shibuya areas of Tokyo, known as centers of youth fashion.

External links
 Theatre Products Official Website (Japanese & English)

Japanese fashion designers
Living people
Year of birth missing (living people)
Place of birth missing (living people)
21st-century Japanese people